Dąbrowa  is a settlement in the administrative district of Gmina Kleszczele, within Hajnówka County, Podlaskie Voivodeship, in north-eastern Poland, close to the border with Belarus.

References

Villages in Hajnówka County